Juan Pablo Vigon Cham (born 20 July 1991) is a Mexican professional footballer who plays as a midfielder for Liga MX club UANL.

References

External links
 
  
 
 
 
 
 
 
 

Living people
1991 births
Mexican footballers
Association football midfielders
Atlas F.C. footballers
Atlético San Luis footballers
Chiapas F.C. footballers
Cafetaleros de Chiapas footballers
Club Universidad Nacional footballers
Liga MX players
Ascenso MX players
Liga Premier de México players
Tercera División de México players
Footballers from Guadalajara, Jalisco